The 1984–85 season was the 70th season of the Isthmian League, which is an English football competition featuring semi-professional and amateur clubs from London, East and South East England. 

The league consisted of three divisions. After 19 clubs, mainly from the Athenian League joined the league, Division Two was divided into two sections.

Also, it was the first Isthmian League season as an Alliance Premier League feeder league. Sutton United were champions, winning their second Isthmian League title. Wycombe Wanderers were promoted to the APL, as Sutton United and Worthing were ineligible for promotion. Epping Town resigned from the league midway through the season and folded.

Premier Division

The Premier Division consisted of 22 clubs, including 20 clubs from the previous season and two new clubs, promoted from Division One:
Epsom & Ewell
Windsor & Eton

League table

Division One

Division One consisted of 22 clubs, including 18 clubs from the previous season and four new clubs:

Two clubs relegated from the Premier Division:
Bromley
Staines Town

Two clubs promoted from Division Two:
Basildon United
St Albans City

League table

Division Two North

Division Two North consisted of 21 clubs, including eight clubs transferred from Division Two, one team relegated from Division One and twelve new teams:

Clubs transferred from Division Two:
 Barton Rovers
 Epping Town
 Finchley
 Hemel Hempstead
 Letchworth Garden City
 Leyton-Wingate
 Tring Town
 Ware

Club relegated from Division One:
 Cheshunt

Clubs joined from the Athenian League:
 Berkhamsted Town
 Chalfont St Peter
 Flackwell Heath
 Harefield United
 Haringey Borough
 Kingsbury Town
 Marlow
 Wolverton Town

Plus:
 Heybridge Swifts, joined from the Essex Senior League
 Royston Town, joined from the South Midlands League
 Saffron Walden Town, joined from the Eastern Counties League
 Stevenage Borough, joined from the United Counties League

League table

Division Two South

Division Two South consisted of 19 clubs, including eleven clubs transferred from Division Two, one team relegated from Division One and seven new clubs:

Clubs transferred from Division Two:
 Dorking
 Eastbourne United
 Egham Town
 Grays Athletic
 Horsham
 Hungerford Town
 Molesey
 Newbury Town
 Rainham Town
 Southall
 Uxbridge

Club relegated from Division One:
 Feltham

Clubs joined from the Athenian League:
 Banstead Athletic
 Camberley Town
 Chertsey Town
 Ruislip Manor
 Whyteleafe

Plus:
 Bracknell Town, joined from the London Spartan League
 Petersfield United, joined from the Hampshire League

League table

See also
Isthmian League
1984–85 Northern Premier League
1984–85 Southern Football League

References

Isthmian League seasons
6